Gavin “The Bull” Bilton (born 23 October 1988) is a professional strongman from Wales and a two-time winner of the UK's Strongest Man competition. He is one of the all time heaviest strongmen in the world, weighing in at 215 kg (474 lbs) during his peak.

Bilton grew up in Caerphilly and attended Bedwas Infants School, Bedwas Junior School and Bedwas High School.

In October 2020, Bilton won 2021 UK's Strongest Man competition at the grounds of the Crumlin Road Jail in Belfast.  He would go on to retain the title in 2021.

Bilton qualified for at the 2020 World's Strongest Man competition in Bradenton, Florida, US, finishing 5th in his heat. He qualified again for the 2021 contest in Sacramento, California, US, finishing 4th in his heat.

Bilton served for 13 years in the Welsh Guards, completing two tours in Afghanistan and acting as a Queen's Guard at Buckingham Palace. Since leaving the army, Gavin has set up his own gym in Caerphilly, called "Area 51".

A former rugby union player, Bilton had spells at Welsh Premiership sides Bridgend, Swansea, Newport, and Bedwas. Bilton played for Caerphilly RFC in the WRU National Bowl final at the Principality Stadium in 2017.

References

1988 births
Living people
Welsh strength athletes
Welsh male weightlifters